The Dicastery for the Doctrine of the Faith (DDF) is the oldest among the departments of the Roman Curia. Its seat is the Palace of the Holy Office in Rome. It was founded to defend the Catholic Church from heresy and is the body responsible for promulgating and defending Roman Catholic doctrine. 

Formerly known as the Supreme Sacred Congregation of the Roman and Universal Inquisition (1542–1908); the Supreme Sacred Congregation of the Holy Office (1908–1965); and then until June 2022 the Congregation for the Doctrine of the Faith (CDF). It is still informally known as the Holy Office in many Catholic countries.

Founded by Pope Paul III in 21 July 1542, the sole objective of the dicastery is to "spread sound Catholic doctrine and defend those points of Christian tradition which seem in danger because of new and unacceptable doctrines." 

Its headquarters are at the Palace of the Holy Office, just outside Vatican City. The congregation employs an advisory board including cardinals, bishops, priests, lay theologians, and canon lawyers. The current Cardinal Prefect is Luis Ladaria Ferrer, who was appointed by Pope Francis for a five-year term since 1 July 2017.

History

On 21 July 1542, Pope Paul III proclaimed the Apostolic Constitution Licet ab initio, establishing the Supreme Sacred Congregation of the Roman and Universal Inquisition, staffed by cardinals and other officials whose task it was "to maintain and defend the integrity of the faith and to examine and proscribe errors and false doctrines." It served as the final court of appeal in trials of heresy and served as an important part of the Counter-Reformation.

This body was renamed the Supreme Sacred Congregation of the Holy Office in 1908 by Pope Pius X. In many Catholic countries, the body is often informally called the Holy Office (e.g.,  and ).

The congregation's name was changed to Sacred Congregation for the Doctrine of the Faith (SCDF) on 7 December 1965, at the end of the Second Vatican Council. Soon after the 1983 Code of Canon Law came into effect, the adjective "sacred" was dropped from the names of all Curial Congregations, and so it became the Congregation for the Doctrine of the Faith.

Timeline

Role

According to the 1988 Apostolic Constitution on the Roman Curia, Pastor bonus, article 48, promulgated by John Paul II: "The proper duty of the Congregation for the Doctrine of the Faith is to promote and safeguard the doctrine on faith and morals in the whole Catholic world; so it has competence in things that touch this matter in any way."

This includes investigations into grave delicts, i.e., acts which the Catholic Church considers as being the most serious crimes: crimes against the Eucharist and against the sanctity of the Sacrament of Penance, and crimes against the sixth Commandment ("Thou shall not commit adultery.") committed by a cleric against a person under the age of eighteen. These crimes, in Sacramentorum sanctitatis tutela a motu proprio of 2001, come under the competency of the Congregation for the Doctrine of the Faith. In effect, it is the "promoter of justice" which deals with, among other things, the question of priests accused of paedophilia.

Within the DDF are the International Theological Commission and the Pontifical Biblical Commission. The Prefect of the DDF is ex officio president of these commissions.

On 7 December 2021, Pope Francis promulgated a new version of the "Norms on the Delicts Reserved to the Congregation of the Doctrine of the Faith"; the original version had been first promulgated in 2001 by John Paul II and amended in 2010 by Benedict XVI. The changes of the new version concern "harmonising the norms with the revised Book VI of the Code of Canon Law, which was promulgated in May 2021" and adding "numerous normative measures of various kinds issued in previous years, especially since 2016."

Organization
Until 1968, the pope held the title of prefect and appointed a cardinal to preside over the meetings, first as Secretary, then as Pro-Prefect.

Since 1968, the Cardinal head of the dicastery has borne the title of Prefect and the title of Secretary refers to the second highest-ranking officer of the Congregation. As of 2012 the Congregation had a membership of 18 cardinals and a smaller number of non-cardinal bishops, a staff of 38 (clerical and lay) and 26 consultors.

The work of the CDF is divided into two sections, the doctrinal and the disciplinary. The CDF holds biennial plenary assemblies, and issues documents on doctrinal, disciplinary, and sacramental questions that occasionally include notifications concerning writings by Catholic theologians.

Recent canonical judgments and publications

The following is a list of recent documents and judgments issued by the CDF. Lengthy CDF documents usually have Latin titles.  A short document that briefly states objections to one or more writings by a Catholic theologian is typically called a "notification".

2021–present 
"Responsum of the Congregation for the Doctrine of the Faith to a  regarding the blessing of the unions of persons of the same sex", wherein the Church reaffirmed the view that "Church does not have, and cannot have, the power to bless unions of persons of the same sex" (15 March 2021).

2011–2020 
 Redemptorist Fr. Tony Flannery is required to sign four fidelity oaths or not return to ministry (1 October 2020).
 "Doctrinal Assessment of the Leadership Conference of Women Religious" (re-affirmed by Pope Francis on 15 April 2013)

2001–2010
  (on bioethical questions, with summary and press conference transcript; 8 September 2008)
 On 5 April 2008, as a result of "grave reservations" by the Congregation for the Doctrine of the Faith about the Mormon practice of posthumous rebaptism, Catholic dioceses throughout the world were directed not to give information in parish registers to the Mormons' Genealogical Society of Utah for microfilming or digitizing.
 On 28 September 2007, Gaston Hebert, the then apostolic administrator of the Diocese of Little Rock, stated that (per the 11 July Congregation for the Doctrine of the Faith) six Arkansas nuns were excommunicated for heresy (the first in the diocese's 165-year history). They refused to recant the doctrines of the Community of the Lady of All Nations (Army of Mary). The nuns are members of the Good Shepherd Monastery of Our Lady of Charity and Refuge in Hot Springs. Sister Mary Theresa Dionne, 82, one of the six, said they will still live at the convent property, which they own. The sect believes that its 86-year-old founder, Marie Paule Giguere, is the reincarnation of the Virgin Mary.
 In an April 2007 address to chaplains, Archbishop Amato denounced same-sex marriage and abortion and criticized the Italian media's coverage of them, saying that they are evils "that remain almost invisible" due to media presentation of them as "expression of human progress".
 "Notification on the works of the Reverend Father Jon Sobrino, SJ" (with an explanatory note; 26 November 2006)
 "Notification regarding the book Jesus Symbol of God of the Reverend Father Roger Haight, SJ"
 "Letter to the Bishops of the Catholic Church on the collaboration of men and women in the Church and in the world" (31 May 2004)
 "Doctrinal Note on some questions regarding the participation of Catholics in political life" (with two commentaries from Cardinals Joachim Meisner and Giacomo Biffi; 24 November 2002)
 "Considerations Regarding Proposals to Give Legal Recognition to Unions Between Homosexual Persons" (3 June 2003)
 "Note on the Force of the Doctrinal Decrees Concerning the Thought and Work of the Reverend Father Antonio Rosmini Serbati" (1 July 2001)
 "Notification on the book Toward a Christian Theology of Religious Pluralism by the Reverend Father Jacques Dupuis, SJ" (with commentary; 24 January 2001)

1991–2000
 "Notification concerning some writings of Professor Dr.  (30 November 2000)
  (Declaration on the unicity and salvific universality of Jesus Christ and the Church; with comments from Congregation officials; 6 August 2000)
 "Notification regarding Sister Jeannine Gramick, SSND, and the Reverend Father Robert Nugent, SDS"
 "Considerations on The Primacy of the Successor of Peter in the mystery of the Church" (31 October 1998)
 "Notification concerning the writings of the Reverend Father Anthony De Mello, SJ" (24 June 1998)
 "Notification concerning the text Mary and Human Liberation by the Reverend Father Tissa Balasuriya, OMI" (2 January 1997)
 "Notification on the writings and activities of Mrs. Vassula Ryden" (6 October 1995)
 "Decree on the doctrine and customs of the Association " (6 June 1992)

1981–1990
  (Letter to the Bishops of the Catholic Church on some aspects of Christian meditation; 15 October 1989)
 "Observation of the Anglican-Roman Catholic International Commission (ARCIC) II's Salvation and the Church" (18 November 1988)
 "Formula to be used for the profession of faith and for the oath of fidelity to assume an office to be exercised in the name of the Church" (1 July 1988)
 Donum vitae (Instruction on respect for life in its origin and on the dignity of procreation; 22 February 1987)
  (Letter to the Bishops of the Catholic Church on the Pastoral Care of Homosexual Persons; 1 October 1986)
 "Notification on the book  (Nelissen, Baarn 1985) by the Reverend Father Professor Edward Schillebeeckx, OP" (15 September 1986)
 "Letter to György Bulányi on certain writings attributed to him" (1 September 1986)
 "Notification on the book Church: Charism and Power: Essay on Militant Ecclesiology by Leonardo Boff, OFM" (11 March 1985)

Leadership

Secretaries until 1965

When the Supreme Sacred Congregation for the Roman and Universal Inquisition was first established in 1542, it was composed of several Cardinal Inquisitors styled as "Inquisitors-General", who were formally equal to each other, even if some of them were clearly dominant (e.g. Cardinal Gian Pietro Carafa from 1542, who was elected Pope Paul IV in 1555). Until 1968 the Pope himself presided over the Congregation. However, from 1564 the daily administration of the affairs of the Congregation was entrusted to the Cardinal Secretary. This model was retained when the Inquisition was formally renamed as the Supreme Sacred Congregation of the Holy Office in 1908.

Unless stated otherwise, the term of office ended with the officeholder's death.

Prefects since 1965
When Pope Paul VI changed the name of the dicastery on 7 December 1965, he changed the title of the cardinal in charge of the daily administration of the Congregation from Secretary to Pro-Prefect. He continued to reserve the title of Prefect to himself until 1968 when he relinquished his role as head of the Congregation and named a Prefect.

Secretaries since 1965
With the December 1965 reorganization of the Holy Office as the Sacred Congregation for the Doctrine of the Faith, the head of the Congregation was no longer titled Secretary. The dicastery's second-in-command, until then titled assessor, was then given the title of Secretary, as was already the case with the other Roman Congregations. All but the most recent have been made archbishops upon their appointment. The following have held the title of Secretary:

Pietro Parente (7 December 1965 – 29 June 1967)
Paul-Pierre Philippe, O.P. (29 June 1967 – 6 March 1973)
Jean Jérôme Hamer, O.P. (14 June 1973 – 8 April 1984)
Alberto Bovone (5 April 1984 – 13 June 1995)
Tarcisio Bertone, S.D.B. (13 June 1995 – 10 December 2002)
Angelo Amato, S.D.B. (19 December 2002 – 9 July 2008)
Luis Ladaria Ferrer, S.J. (9 July 2008 – 2 July 2017)
Giacomo Morandi (18 July 2017 – 10 January 2022)
John Joseph Kennedy (Disciplinary Section) and Armando Matteo (Doctrinal Section) (23 April 2022 – present)

Present composition 

 Cardinal-Prefect: Luis Ladaria Ferrer, S.J.
 Secretary for Discipline: John Joseph Kennedy
 Secretary for Doctrine: Armando Matteo
 Adjunct Secretary: Archbishop Joseph Augustine Di Noia, O.P. 
 Adjunct Secretary: Archbishop Charles Scicluna
 Undersecretary: Fr. Matteo Visioli
 Undersecretary: Fr. Philippe Curbelié
 Promoter of Justice: Fr. Robert J. Geisinger S.J.
 27 members
 28 Consultors (religious superiors and canon lawyers)
 Staff of 33 lay theologians

See also

 Inquisition
 Index Librorum Prohibitorum
 Archive of the Congregation for the Doctrine of the Faith
 Strengthening Church Members Committee, a Mormon organization which serves a similar role

Notes

References

External links

Index of recent documents on doctrine
Index of recent documents on discipline
Index of recent documents on sacramental questions

 
1542 establishments in the Papal States
Catholic organizations established in the 16th century
Religious organizations established in the 1540s